'''Panchanagar ''' is a town in Bardaghat Municipality in Nawalparasi District in the Lumbini Zone of southern Nepal. The municipality was established on 18 May 2014 by merging existing Makar and Panchanagar VDCs. At the time of the 1991 Nepal census it had a population of 6238 people living in 1023 individual households. This VDC lies near the Churya Hilly Range.The inhabitants people who live here are mostly Chhetri, Brahmin, Tharu, Magar, Newar, Dalits and Adhibasi. Most Youngest Nepali Football Team Star  Bimal Magar was Born in Panchanagar VDC.

References

Populated places in Parasi District